Iddaru Iddare is a 1990 Telugu-language action drama film, produced by Akkineni Venkat and Yarllagada Surendra under Annapurna Studios and S.S. Creations banner and directed by A. Kodandarami Reddy. It stars Akkineni Nageswara Rao, Nagarjuna and Ramya Krishna, with music composed by Raj–Koti.

Plot 
Justice Madhusudhan Rao is a disciple of Justice. Once his judgment over a criminal Ramadasu, his henchmen Jayaram kidnaps Madhusudhan Rao's child Ravi and threatens him. But he does not yield and gives a death sentence. So, Ramadasu orders Jayaram to eliminate the child but kind-hearted Jayaram absconds the child and a woman called Ramanamma rears him. Years roll by, Ravi grows up as a local goon, whenever the father & son meet they quarrel with each other and stand like enemies in different paths. Ravi loves Madhusudhan Rao's niece Aruna to which Madhusudhan Rao opposes but his wife Lakshmi requests to accept the alliance. Soon, Madhusudhan Rao reaches Ravi and asks to change his lifestyle but he refuses. Parallelly, Ramadasu who slipped away from punishment becomes a huge gangster-like Thulasi Das, creating a lot of trouble Jayaram and his dealers headed. So, Jayaram hires Ravi and he becomes a tough nut to Thulasi Das. So, he indicts Ravi and sends him to jail. Here Jayaram recognizes Ravi as Madhusudhan Rao's son and reveals to him. Yet, Madhusudhan Rao declares execution to Ravi. Before leaving Ravi challenges that he will definitely eliminate his enemies. To protect his son Madhusudhan Rao takes him away to a secret place on his assurance and tries to reform with ruthless behavior. Meanwhile, Aruna reaches the forest, both of them try to escape. At the same time, Thulasi Das men attack Ravi when Madhusudhan Rao is wounded while guarding Ravi against harm. Now Ravi too learns the truth. Finally, both father & son unite and cease baddies.

Cast 
 Akkineni Nageswara Rao as Justice Madhusudhan Rao
 Nagarjuna as Ravibabu
 K. R. Vijaya as Lakshmi
 Ramya Krishna as Aruna
 Kota Srinivasa Rao as Ramadasu / Thulasi Das
 Gollapudi Maruthi Rao as Raghava Rao
 Rama Prabha as Ramanamma
 Ranganath as Jayaram
 Babu Mohan
 Mallikarjuna Rao
 Jaya Prakash Reddy as Ramireddy
 Anand Raj as Teja
 Mohan Raj as Joseph
 Husain as Husain

Soundtrack 
Music composed by Raj–Koti. Music released on LEO Audio Company.

References 

Films directed by A. Kodandarami Reddy
Films scored by Raj–Koti
1990s Telugu-language films